Thizz Entertainment is a San Francisco Bay Area-based, independent record label, started in 1999 by rapper and music producer Andre Hicks, who was professionally known as rapper Mac Dre. Best known as a poster child of the hyphy movement that swept through the Bay Area in the 1990s and early 2000s.

In 2004, Hicks was murdered by an unknown assailant while traveling after a performance in Kansas City, Missouri. Upon Hicks's death and at his written direction, his mother, Wanda Salvatto, (affectionally known as "Mac Wanda") became owner and CEO.

There are no artists signed to the label and the company's primary focus is to manage Mac Dre's expansive music catalog of over 25 albums, preserve his legacy, and to hold artistic events to honor his memory.

Background 
Mac Dre was a rapper of many monikers, a natural comedian with an incredible work ethic, and an artist who forever changed the course of Bay Area hip-hop. From recording verses through a phone while serving time for a robbery charge to bringing phrases like "thizz," "go dumb," and "ghost ride the whip" into the lexicon, Dre left an indelible mark on his community during his short but prolific lifetime.  "It was always just great energy," friend and fellow rapper Mistah F.A.B. says of his performances. "You felt like when you left the show, you left Mardi Gras. That's just how dope he was."

In 1999, Hicks had relocated to Sacramento and founded Thizz Entertainment.

Music

1999-2004 
From its creation, the label, has been fundamental in the growth and popularity of the Bay Area Hyphy movement. Mac Dre's most popular albums including, Ronald Dregan: Dreganomics, The Genie of the Lamp, Thizzelle Washington, Mac Dre's the Name, were released under the label and distributed locally in partnership with City Hall Records in San Rafael.

2004 - Present 
Dedicated to protecting the works and legacy of Mac Dre, the label does not sign recording artists. Rappers and musicians that were previously associated with Mac Dre and his labels, and are still active in music, continue to support the label's efforts by promoting the brand within their own endeavors, paying homage by adding a "Thizz" prefix to their own label or production company. However, outside of this small and exclusive group, "Many in the rap game attach themselves to the term “thizz” to make a name for themselves and ride Mac Dre's coattails" said Black Dog Bone, editor of Vallejo-based Murder Dog magazine, which chronicles the rap scene.

The label, unaware of how frequently rappers and others were self associating themselves the label was shocked to learn in April 2012, eight years after Hicks's death, Thizz Entertainment was named by US Drug Enforcement agents in connection with the mass arrest of 25 individuals in Vallejo, Stockton, Fairfield, Oakland, Los Angeles, New York, and Oklahoma City. Several that were arrested had falsely purported publicly to be signed and/or otherwise a part of the label.

As of 2018, Former Thizz Entertainment artists continue to support and assist Salvatto in curtailing flagrant misuse or misrepresentation of affiliation to the current label or Mac Dre's brand by unauthorized third parties which is an on-going effort.

Annual Events
Ten years after his death, his mother was still receiving an excess of requests, comments, letters from young people, with stories of how Mac Dre affected them or got them through tough times in their young lives. “I didn't realize how big his presence was in the Bay Area and actually across the United States ” stated Salvatto. She wanted to give young artists a chance who may not otherwise have an opportunity to showcase their talent.

Dre Area: The Mac Dre Art Show 
In 2015, the label began to host an annual Dre Area:The Mac Dre Art Show in Oakland. The event showcases art pieces by various artists nationwide that are inspired by Mac Dre legacy.

Mac Dre Day 
In 2018, the label held its 3rd annual Mac Dre Day in San Francisco at The Regency Ballroom on July 5, what would have been Mac Dre's 48th birthday. “One of the reasons it's important” for the event to happen “is that he had an impact on young people in the Bay Area,” said Mac Wanda, going by the name because “that's what the kids call me.” The event was hosted by rapper Mally Mall and San Francisco radio station  KMEL's DJ Amen and featured performances by Tyga, Nef The Pharaoh, Mistah F.A.B., Philthy Rich, Coolio Da Unda Dogg, Baby Bash more, including several known rappers from the bay area that Mac Dre would frequently collaborate on songs over the years.  There has been no incidents of negative occurrence at the events with Salvatto stating that she thinks fans understand that the show's organizer is his mother.

Other Media
Thizz Entertainment created the DVD series Treal TV

In 2014, veteran actor, Tray Chaney, best known on the popular HBO drama series, The Wire, announced that he has been selected to produce as star in two upcoming Mac Dre films in partnership with Thizz Entertainment.

Inspired by the rapper Drake after he spoke to Salvatto on how much Mac Dre impacted his life and career, in 2015, Thizz Entertainment released the documentary, Legend of the Bay, narrated by rapper and journalist Sway Calloway. The documentary details the Bay Area legend's life and includes never-before-seen concert footage, home movies, exclusive interviews with Mac Dre's friends, family, and music artists such as Wiz Khalifa, Tech N9ne, and Warren G.

References

American record labels
Hip hop record labels
Companies based in Solano County, California
1999 establishments in California
Gangsta rap record labels